Wuritubilige (born October 5, 1987 in Ulanqab, Inner Mongolia) is a male Chinese judoka who represented China at the 2008 Summer Olympics in the Half lightweight (60–66 kg) event.

Major performances
2007 National Champions Tournament and Olympic Selective Trials for Beijing 2008 – 1st 66 kg class

References

External links
http://2008teamchina.olympic.cn/index.php/personview/personsen/2771

1987 births
Living people
Chinese male judoka
Judoka at the 2008 Summer Olympics
Olympic judoka of China
People from Ulanqab
Sportspeople from Inner Mongolia
21st-century Chinese people